Polish composer Witold Lutosławski wrote his Symphony No. 1 in 1941–47, completing it in 1947.

Structure
The symphony, lasting 25 minutes, is in four movements. The first, Allegro giusto, is a sonata allegro. The second is marked Poco adagio, while the third (Allegretto misterioso) is a scherzo whose opening theme is based on a twelve-note tone-row. The final movement is marked Allegro vivace.

Instrumentation

Woodwinds
2 piccolos
flute
2 oboes
English horn
3 clarinets, 2nd doubling on piccolo clarinet in E
2 bassoons
contrabassoon

Brass
4 horns in F
3 trumpets in C
3 trombones
tuba

Percussion
timpani
drum
cymbals
xylophone

Keyboards
piano

Strings
harp
violins I and II
violas
cellos
double basses

Analysis
"Witold Lutosławski: Symphony No. 1"

Orchestration

World Premiere
The Grand Symphony Orchestra of the Polish Radio (WOSPR) performed its world premiere (conducted by Grzegorz Fitelberg, to whom it was dedicated) in Katowice on April 1, 1948.

References

1
1947 compositions
Lutoslawski 1